Budraitis is a Lithuanian patronymic surname deriver from the ancient Lithuaninan given name Budrys . Notable people with the surname include:

Ieva Budraitė (born 1992), Lithuanian politician
Juozas Budraitis (born 1940), Lithuanian actor

See also

Lithuanian-language surnames
Patronymic surnames